Birmingham City Business School is a school within Birmingham City University based on the university's City Centre campus in Birmingham. It is part of the Faculty of Business, Law and Social Sciences.

The Business School offers courses in Accountancy, Advertising, Business, Business Law, Business Information Technology, Business Psychology, Economics, Finance, Human Resource Management, Information Communication Technology, Management, Marketing, Multimedia Development, Public Relations and Software Engineering. It formerly offered courses in Computing, although these are now part of the university's Faculty of Technology, Engineering and the Environment.

The Association of Chartered Certified Accountants has awarded Birmingham City University Business School Platinum Level Status for its training until 2010.  This means that their ACCA courses are delivered to the highest possible level according to industry standards.

The Business School was the first place to publicise contract cheating, where students put work out to tender and suppliers bid to produce work for those students.

Structure 
The Business School incorporates three academic departments and two specialist centres:
 Department of Accountancy and Finance
 Department of Business and Marketing
 Department of Management and Human Resources
 Centre for Leadership and Management Practice
 Centre for Internal Audit, Governance and Risk Management

See also 
 Education in Birmingham

External links 
 

Business School
Accounting schools in the United Kingdom
Business schools in England
Perry Barr